"Blues Jumped the Rabbit" is a blues song. Early variations on the song include Blind Lemon Jefferson's 1926 song "Rabbit Foot Blues" and Jimmie Noone And His New Orleans Band's 1927 song "The Blues Jumped A Rabbit". The Allen Brothers (American duo) song "Shanghai Rooster Blues," recorded for RCA Victor Company, Inc. in Memphis, Tennessee on June 5, 1930, contains the lyrics:

The song was recorded by Big Joe Turner in April, 1950 in New Orleans, Louisiana.  Turner is backed by Dave Bartholomew's band, with Fats Domino on piano.

A different song with the same title is a track on the album Cotton Eyed Joe recorded by Karen Dalton in 1962. A slightly altered version called "Blues Chase up a Rabbit" was recorded by Judy Henske in 1964. Both versions contain variations of the lyrics:

Another variation of these lyrics appeared in The Grateful Dead's version of traditional blues song "I Know You Rider" which they first performed in 1965.

Karen Dalton's "Blues Jumped the Rabbit" also contains the lyrics:

They also appear in Taj Mahal's song "Good Morning Miss Brown" on his 1968 album The Natch'l Blues.

References

Blues songs